Xylomoia is a genus of moths of the family Noctuidae.

Species
 Xylomoia apameoides Hacker, 1989
 Xylomoia chagnoni Barnes & Benjamin, 1917
 Xylomoia fusei Sugi, 1976
 Xylomoia graminea (Graeser, [1889])
 Xylomoia indirecta (Grote, 1875)
 Xylomoia retinax Mikkola, 1998
 Xylomoia stangelmaieri Mikkola, 1998
 Xylomoia strix Mikkola, 1980

Former species
 Xylomoia didonea is now Photedes didonea (Smith, 1894)

References
Natural History Museum Lepidoptera genus database
Xylomoia at funet

Hadeninae